Jeļena Ostapenko was the defending champion, but entered the Women's singles instead awarded as wild card and lost to Kristina Mladenovic in the second round.

Unseeded Russian Sofya Zhuk won the title, defeating compatriot Anna Blinkova 7–5, 6–4 in the final.

Seeds

Main draw

Finals

Top half

Section 1

Section 2

Bottom half

Section 3

Section 4

External links

Girls' Singles
Wimbledon Championship by year – Girls' singles